Lycoris is a genus of 13–20 species of flowering plants in the family Amaryllidaceae, subfamily Amaryllidoideae. They are native to eastern and southern Asia in China, Japan, southern Korea, northern Vietnam, northern Laos, northern Thailand, northern Burma, Nepal, northern Pakistan, Afghanistan, and eastern Iran. They were imported into North Carolina and now grow wild. In English they are also called hurricane lilies or cluster amaryllis. The genus shares the English name spider lily with two other related genera.

Description
They are bulb-producing perennial plants. The leaves are long and slender, 30–60 cm long and only 0.5–2 cm broad. The scape is erect, 30–70 cm tall, bearing a terminal umbel of four to eight flowers, which can be white, yellow, orange, or red. The flowers divide into two types, those with very long, filamentous stamens two or three times as long as the tepals (subgenus Lycoris; e.g. Lycoris radiata), and those with shorter stamens not much longer than the tepals (subgenus Symmanthus Traub & Moldenke; e.g. Lycoris sanguinea). The fruit is a three-valved capsule containing several black seeds. Many of the species are sterile, reproducing only vegetatively, and are probably of hybrid origin; several additional known hybrids occur.

Selected species
, the World Checklist of Selected Plant Families recognizes 22 species and one hybrid:

 Lycoris albiflora Koidz. (treated as the hybrid L. × albiflora by some sources) – white spider lily - Jiangsu, Korea, Kyushu
 Lycoris anhuiensis Y.Xu & G.J.Fan - Anhui, Jiangsu
 Lycoris argentea Worsley - Myanmar
 Lycoris aurea (L'Hér.) Herb. (syn. Nerine aurea) – golden spider lily - China, Japan incl Ryukyu Is, Indochina, Taiwan
 Lycoris caldwellii Traub – magic lily - Jiangsu, Jiangxi, Zhejiang
 Lycoris chinensis Traub – yellow surprise lily - Henan, Jiangsu, Shaanxi, Sichuan, Zhejiang, Korea
 Lycoris flavescens M.Kim & S.Lee - Korea
 Lycoris guangxiensis Y.Xu & G.J.Fan - Guangxi
 Lycoris haywardii Traub - Japan
 Lycoris houdyshelii Traub - Jiangsu, Zhejiang, Matsu Islands, Japan
 Lycoris incarnata Comes ex Sprenger – peppermint surprise lily - Hubei, Yunnan
 Lycoris josephinae Traub - Sichuan
 Lycoris koreana Nakai - Korea, †Japan
 Lycoris longituba Y.C.Hsu & G.J.Fan – long tube surprise lily - Jiangsu
 Lycoris radiata (L'Hér.) Herb. – spider lily, red spider lily - China, Korea, Japan, Matsu Islands, Nepal; naturalized in Seychelles and in scattered places in United States
 Lycoris rosea Traub & Moldenke - Jiangsu, Zhejiang
 Lycoris sanguinea Maxim. – orange spider lily - Japan
 Lycoris shaanxiensis Y.Xu & Z.B.Hu - Sichuan, Shaanxi
 Lycoris sprengeri Comes ex Baker – tie dye surprise lily - Anhui, Hubei, Jiangsu, Zhejiang, Matsu Islands
 Lycoris squamigera Maxim. – naked lady, surprise lily, magic lily, resurrection lily - Jiangsu, Shandong, Zhejiang, Japan, Korea; naturalized in Ohio, Tennessee
 Lycoris straminea Lindl. - Jiangsu, Zhejiang
 Lycoris uydoensis M.Kim - Korea

formerly included
A few names have been coined using the name Lycoris but referring to species now considered better suited to other genera (Griffinia and Ungernia). Here are links to help you find appropriate information.
 Lycoris hyacinthina - Griffinia hyacinthina
 Lycoris radiata - Ungernia trisphaera
 Lycoris severzowii - Ungernia severzowii

Hybrids
Lycoris × chejuensis chejuensis K.H.Tae & S.C.Ko - Korea

Cultivation and uses
Lycoris are extensively cultivated as ornamental plants in China and Japan, and also in other warm temperate regions of the world. In Japan, they are widely used at the edges of rice paddy fields to provide a strip of bright flowers in the summer, and over 230 cultivars have been selected for garden use. They are locally naturalised in the southeastern United States, where they are often called hurricane flowers, due to their blooming period coinciding with the peak of hurricane season. In China, people often use them as decorations in festivals or celebrations.

Legends
Since these scarlet flowers usually bloom near cemeteries around the autumnal equinox, they are described in Chinese and Japanese translations of the Lotus Sutra as ominous flowers that grow in Diyu (also known as Hell), or Huángquán, and guide the dead into the next reincarnation.

When the flowers of Lycoris bloom, their leaves would have fallen; when their leaves grow, the flowers would have wilted. This habit gave rise to various legends. A famous one is the legend of two elves: Mañju, who guarded the flower, and Saka, who guarded the leaves. Out of curiosity, they defied their fate of guarding the herb alone and managed to meet each other. At first sight, they fell in love with each other. God, exasperated by their waywardness, separated the miserable couple, and laid a curse on them as a punishment: the flowers of Mañju shall never meet the leaves of Saka again.

It was said that when the couple met after death in Diyu, they vowed to meet each other after reincarnation. However, neither of them could keep their word.

In commemoration of the couple, some call the herbs "Mañjusaka", a mixture of "Mañju" and "Saka", instead of their scientific name. The same name is used in Japanese, in which it is pronounced manju-syage.

Some other legends have it that when a person sees someone that they may never meet again, these flowers, also called red spider lilies, would bloom along the path. Perhaps because of these sorrowful legends, Japanese people often used these flowers in funerals.

Gallery

See also
 List of plants known as lily

References

External links

 Images of Lycoris Flavon's art gallery - Amaryllidaceae
 Photo Gallery of Lycoris Juniper Level Botanic Gardens Lycoris Collection

Amaryllidaceae genera
Amaryllidoideae